Portraits by Frank Weston Benson are portraits that Frank Weston Benson was commissioned to make or made of his family. He also made landscapes, wildlife, interiors and other works of art.

After his studies at the School of the Museum of Fine Arts, Boston and Académie Julian in Paris, Benson obtained commissions from judges, businessmen, and college presidents to paint portraits of themselves and their family members. In 1896 Benson began work on murals for the Library of Congress in Washington, D.C.: The Graces and The Four Seasons.

Works
Benson was commissioned by distinguished New England families to paint portraits of family members. His own family members were favorite subjects.

Starting with Portrait of Margaret Washburn Walker Benson began receiving commissions from judges, college presidents, and businessmen to paint portraits of themselves and family members. He also painted portraits of friends and family. This portrait of Margaret Washburn Walker required twenty-six sittings.

Notes

References

Bibliography

External links

Frank Weston Benson